The Pandit Jasraj Institute for Music, Research, Artistry and Appreciation (PJIM) is a non-profit 501 (c)(3) institute that fosters the preservation, growth and teaching of Indian classical music in the tradition of the Mewati gharana, named after Jasraj. The institute is based in New Hyde Park (NY) and has branches in Manhattan (NY), Edison (NJ) and Pittsburgh (PA).

Activities 
The institute organizes an annual workshop titled Shibir, publishes the JasRangi Magazine and organizes artistes' concerts.

See also
Pandit Jasraj Institute of Music Toronto, based in the Greater Toronto Area

References 

501(c)(3) organizations
Music schools in New York City
Music schools in New Jersey
Music schools in Pennsylvania
Indian classical music
Mewati gharana